Herman Kogan (November 6, 1914 – March 8, 1989) was an American journalist who spent fifty years covering the city of Chicago, many with the Chicago Daily News and Chicago Sun-Times.

Kogan, a 1936 graduate of the University of Chicago and a Phi Beta Kappa, authored several books, including The Great EB: The Story of the Encyclopædia Britannica] (University of Chicago Press, 1958); Yesterday's Chicago (E.A. Seeman, 1976); Give the Lady What She Wants: The Story of Marshall Field & Company (Co-autored with Lloyd Wendt, Rand McNally, 1952); Big Bill of Chicago (Co-authored with Lloyd Wendt, Bobbs-Merrill, 1953); Lords of the Levee (Co-authored with Lloyd Wendt; Bobbs-Merrill, 1943) and Chicago: A Pictorial History (co-authored with Lloyd Wendt; Bonanza, 1958).

Kogan was the father of current Chicago Tribune journalist and WBEZ radio host Rick Kogan. Kogan was Jewish.

Citations

External links 
 Bet a million! The story of John W. Gates by Lloyd Wendt and Herman Kogan. Indianapolis, Bobbs-Merrill Co. [1948]
 Herman Kogan Papers at the Newberry Library

Writers from Chicago
Encyclopædia Britannica
Chicago Sun-Times people
Jewish American writers
1914 births
1989 deaths
20th-century American writers
20th-century American journalists
American male journalists
20th-century American Jews
University of Chicago alumni